Oasis is an ongoing South Korean television series starring Jang Dong-yoon, Seol In-ah, and Choo Young-woo. It premiered on March 6, 2023, on KBS2, and airs every Monday and Tuesday at 21:50 (KST). It is also available for streaming on Viki and Wavve in selected regions.

Synopsis
Set against the turbulent backdrop of South Korea from the 1980s to the 1990s, the series depicts the story of three young people who fight fiercely to protect their dreams, friendship, and their one and only first love.

Cast

Main
 Jang Dong-yoon as Lee Doo-hak: the son of a farmer in a quiet and small village in Yeosu.
 Seol In-ah as Oh Jung-shin: an honest and confident woman who knows how to fight against injustice.
 Choo Young-woo as Choi Chul-woong: Doo-hak's childhood friend-turned-rival who is an intelligent and competitive man.

Supporting

People around Doo-hak
 Kim Myung-soo as Lee Jung-ho: Doo-hak's father who is a farmer.
 So Hee-jung as Jeom Am-daek: Doo-hak's mother.
 Shin Yun-ha as Lee Jung-ok: Doo-hak's younger sister.
 Do Sang-woo as Kim Hyung-joo: a young man who meets Doo-hak by chance and then unites with him in loyalty to confront the chaotic era.
 Song Tae-yoon as Kim Gil-su: Doo-hak's left hand man.
 Ahn Dong-yeop as Jo Seon-woo: a high school boxer.
 Han Jae-young as Yeom Gwang-tak: Mugyo-dong Tak-ipa boss who operates nightclubs, tourist hotels, and liquor wholesalers.
 Jang Young-hyun as Yoo Young-pil: Tak-ipa's action leader.
 Lee Han-wi as Go Pung-ho: a former criminal in real estate fraud, whom Doo-hak met in prison.
 Jung Ji-soon as Jang Jang-deuk: a member of Pung-ho's real estate fraud organization called Joseobang.
 Lee Gyo-yeop as Son Su-gong: a document counterfeiter.
 Jang Da-kyung as Ma Cheong-ja: a member of Pung-ho's real estate fraud organization called Joseobang.
 Im Seung-jun as Wolf: a member of Tak-ipa.
 Jo Dong-woo as Rotary: a member of Tak-ipa.

People around Jung-shin
 Kang Ji-eun as Cha Geum-ok: an exclusive distributor and producer of films in Gwangju and Jeonnam, who is also Jung-shin's mentor.
 Seunghee as Ham Yang-ja: Jung-shin's best friend.
 Ahn Jung-hoon as Go Moon-geun: Geum-ok's butler.

People around Chul-woong
 Kang Kyung-heon as Kang Yeo-jin: Chul-woong's mother.
 Jeon No-min as Hwang Chung-seong: a former brigadier general of the security forces.
 Jin Yi-han as Oh Man-ok: Chung-seong's right-hand man.
 Park Won-sang as Choi Young-sik: Chul-woong's father.
 Ha Hye-seung as Gyeong-ja: a maid who works at Chul-woong's house.

Others
 Bae Seul-gi as Song Yeon-ju: a successful actress in both movies and dramas.
 Kang Pil-seon as Moon Dong-su: a night school teacher and leader of the Guro Industrial Complex union.
 Ahn Da-bi as Gil-ja: Jung-ok's hometown sister.
 Jang Young-jun as Ki Young-tak: a student from another school who bullies Chul-woong.

Special appearance
 Kim Hyo-jin as Oh Tae-ja

Production
Filming began in September 2022.

Viewership

References

External links
  
 
 
 

Korean-language television shows
Korean Broadcasting System television dramas
South Korean melodrama television series
Television series by RaemongRaein
2023 South Korean television series debuts

Television series set in the 1980s
Television series set in the 1990s